Questi ragazzi or These Children is a 1937 Italian "white-telephones" comedy film directed by Mario Mattoli.

Cast
Vittorio De Sica
Paola Barbara
Enrico Viarisio
Giuditta Rissone
Checco Rissone
Armando Migliari
Adele Garavaglia
Annette Ciarli
Yvonne Sandner
Renzo Brunori
Massimo Morosini
Anna Maria Pauli
Maria Polese
Anna Valpreda

External links 
 

1937 films
Italian black-and-white films
1930s Italian-language films
1937 comedy films
Films directed by Mario Mattoli
Italian comedy films
1930s Italian films